Thomas Rice (March 30, 1768 – August 25, 1854) was a U.S. Representative from Massachusetts.

Thomas Rice was born March 30, 1768 in Pownalborough in the Province of Massachusetts Bay (now known as Wiscasset, Maine), to Thomas Rice and Rebecca (Kingsbury) Rice. He graduated from Harvard University in 1791.  He studied law and was admitted to the bar in Suffolk County, Massachusetts, in 1794 and commenced practice in Winslow in Massachusetts' District of Maine, the following year.  Thomas Rice married Sarah Swan on October 22, 1796.  He was appointed in 1807 by the supreme judicial court of Maine one of the examiners of counselors and attorneys for Kennebec County. He served as member of the Massachusetts House of Representatives in 1814.

Rice was elected as a Federalist to the Fourteenth and Fifteenth Congresses (March 4, 1815 – March 3, 1819).  He was an unsuccessful candidate for reelection in 1818 to the Sixteenth Congress.  He resumed the practice of law.  After Sarah Swan Rice died September 26, 1840,  Rice remarried to Susanna Greene, daughter of Col R. H. Greene, on February 16, 1841 at Winslow, Maine.  To this marriage, he had a son, Thomas III, who was born in 1843.  He died in Winslow, Maine, on August 25, 1854.  He was interred at Pine Grove Cemetery, Waterville, Maine.

Thomas Rice was a direct descendant of Edmund Rice an early immigrant to Massachusetts Bay Colony as follows:

 Thomas Rice, son of
 Thomas Rice (November 27, 1734 - April 21, 1812), son of
 Noah Rice (1705 - Feb 1759), son of
 Thomas Rice (30 Jun 1654 - 1747), son of
 Thomas Rice (26 Jan 1625 - 16 Nov 1681), son of
 Edmund Rice (1594 - 3 May 1663)

References

Sources

External links

 

1768 births
1854 deaths
People from Wiscasset, Maine
Members of the United States House of Representatives from the District of Maine
Members of the Massachusetts House of Representatives
Harvard College alumni
People from Winslow, Maine
Federalist Party members of the United States House of Representatives from Massachusetts